Lăceni may refer to several villages in Romania:

 Lăceni, a village in the town of Costeşti, Argeș County
 Lăceni, a village in Orbeasca Commune, Teleorman County